Contextual documentation is an information block approach to writing in-situ documentation. 

It becomes particularly useful when dealing with in-situ documentation delivered to the software GUI, to devise a matrix of required help to users in a particular situation or context. 
This concept is based on  DITA, where small topics are written when needed asking the right questions:
 What is this and/or what does it do?
 How do I use it?
 Do I have an example?
 Where am I in terms of a workflow?
 What next?
 What pitfalls to avoid?
This is an editorial matrix, a content guideline as sorts. By no means are all items to be written exhaustively as if they were a form to be filled
.

References

Technical communication